Dracunculus is a genus of two species of a tuberous perennial of the family Araceae. They are characterised by a large purple spathe and spadix, often produced in advance of the pedate, dark green leaves often with white mottling. The open spathe is usually accompanied by a foul smell.

The best known species is Dracunculus vulgaris, which is sometimes grown in gardens for ornamental purposes.

They are native to the Mediterranean, Madeira and the Canary Islands where they are found in rocky areas, hillsides and waste ground.

Species

References

Aroideae
Araceae genera
Taxa named by Philip Miller